Xingcheng station is a station on Yanfang Line of the Beijing Subway. It was opened on 30 December 2017.

Station Layout 
The station has an elevated island platform.

Exits 
The station has 2 exits, lettered A and B. Both exits are accessible.

Gallery

References 

Beijing Subway stations in Fangshan District